Clankelly (Irish: Clann Cheallaigh, meaning Clan Kelly or, more literally, 'Offspring of Ceallaigh') is a barony in County Fermanagh, Northern Ireland. It is the only barony in County Fermanagh not connected to Lough Erne. It is bordered by two other baronies in Northern Ireland: Coole to the south-west; and Magherastephana to the north-west. It also borders two baronies in the Republic of Ireland: Monaghan to the north-east; and Dartree to the south-east.

History
Clankelly takes its name from Cellach, son of Tuathal, a king of the Ui Chremthainn. The MacDonnell sept of the Clann Cheallaigh are noted here, and by the 13th century, the O'Cannons, who had been ousted as kings of Cinel Conaill, settled here for a period.

List of main settlements
Rosslea

List of civil parishes

Below is a list of civil parishes in Clankelly:
Clones
Drummully (split with barony of Coole)
Galloon (split with baronies of Coole and Knockninny)

References

Baronies of County Fermanagh
County Fermanagh